GVK Industries Limited or  GVK Group is an Indian conglomerate based in Hyderabad stretching across assorted sectors comprising energy, resources, airports and transportation. After acquiring Australian coal mines in Queensland for 1.26 billion, GVK forecasts an investment of 10 billion in mine, rail and port project.

Businesses

Energy
GVK's energy portfolio comprises CCPP (gas/naphtha-based), thermal (coal-based) and hydro power plants.

Projects under operation
 469 MW Gautami CCPP, Andhra Pradesh commenced operations in 2009.
 228 MW Jegurupadu CCPP Phase 2 – 228 MW, Andhra Pradesh commenced operations in 2009 
 330 MW Srinagar HEP, Uttarakhand commenced operations in 2015 .
540 MW Goindwal Sahib Thermal Power Project, Punjab, commenced operations in 2016

Projects under construction and development
 850 MW Ratle Hydro Electric Project, Jammu and Kashmir

Resources

Coal
Australia:

GVK has secured 79% stake each in Alpha Coal and Alpha West Coal mines and 100% stake in Kevin's Corner mines in Queensland, Australia for 1.26 billion with total resources of about 8 billion tonne and a capacity of over 80 million tonne per annum. When combined, these projects will create one of the largest coal mining operations in the world. GVK has also acquired 100% stake in a 500 km rail line and a 60 million tonne per annum port as part of the ‘pit-to-port’ logistics solution. The project proposes a total investment of 10 billion. This acquisition was awarded as “Asia Deal of the Year” and “Asia Outbound Investor of the Year” at the 8th Asia Mining Awards 2012, Singapore. GVK has received all pertinent approvals having reference to mine, rail and port projects from both the State and Federal Government and is in the culminating stages of project development.
.

Airports

India 
GVK's thrust into the aviation sector set about with the modernization of Chhatrapati Shivaji International Airport (CSIA) in Mumbai. Further, with the acquisition of Kempegowda International Airport (KIA) in Bengaluru, GVK has become one of the largest airport operators in the country handling a combined traffic of over 60 mppa at these two airports.

Between 2016 and 2018, GVK sold its stake in Bengaluru International Airport Limited (BIAL) to Fairfax India. In 2021, GVK sold its operations at Mumbai International Airport Limited (MIAL) to the Adani Group.

Indonesia
GVK has collaborated with the Airports Authority of Indonesia, Angkasa Pura Airports (AP1), for operations, management and development of non-aeronautical commercial services at Denpasar International Airport, Bali. GVK is also developing an International greenfield airport in Yogyakarta, Special Region of Yogyakarta.

Transportation
Roads:

GVK's Jaipur – Kishangarh Expressway, Rajasthan, the first privately operated six-lane road project with 542.4 lane km. GVK's road portfolio encompasses other projects of over 900 lane km under various stages of construction and development:

Projects under operation
 Jaipur – Kishangarh Expressway (542.4 lane km), Rajasthan
 Deoli – Kota Expressway (332.16 lane km), Rajasthan

Projects under construction and development
 Bagodara – Vasad Expressway (611.4 lane km), Gujarat

Ports
 GVK has signed an MoU with the Government of Gujarat, to develop a greenfield port at Okha.

Hospitality
GVK has seven TAJGVK properties across Hyderabad, Chandigarh, Chennai and Mumbai having a total key base of 1372. These include Taj Krishna, Taj Deccan, Taj Banjara and Vivanta by Taj Group in Hyderabad; Taj Chandigarh, Taj Clubhouse in Chennai and Taj Santacruz in Mumbai. It is also coming up with the Ginger brand in Andhra Pradesh to cater to the value segment.

References

GVK Group
Companies listed on the National Stock Exchange of India
Companies listed on the Bombay Stock Exchange